The 2013–14 season was Futbol Club Barcelona's 114th in existence and the club's 83rd consecutive season in the top flight of Spanish football. This was the first and only season under head coach Gerardo Martino.

This season was the first since 2006–07 without fellow teammate Eric Abidal, who departed to Monaco after his contract expired.

Kit

Season overview

June
On 3 June, Brazilian Neymar was officially presented as a Barcelona player to more than 50,000 fans at Camp Nou. He joined the squad after the 2013 FIFA Confederations Cup in Brazil. On 20 June, after spending the previous season on loan to Mallorca, it was officially announced that Andreu Fontàs will be joining Celta de Vigo for a sum of €1 million. Barça will retain a buy-back clause in addition to the player's rights in any future transfer. While at Celta, Fontàs will be reunited with former Barcelona B coach Luis Enrique, whom he managed between 2008 and 2010. On 28 June, it was announced that Santos will participate in the 2013 edition of the Joan Gamper Trophy on 2 August at the Camp Nou. Santos' participation was agreed upon Barça signing Neymar.

July
On 6 July, Bojan was officially loaned to Ajax with an option for a second year loan spell. Bojan explained that conversations with Johan Cruyff had influenced his decision to move to Ajax, as well as the opportunity to play in the UEFA Champions League. On 8 July, Barcelona announced the transfer of Spanish international forward David Villa to Atlético Madrid for a reported fee of €5.1 million and reserve the right to 50% of any future sale of the player. Villa, who joined Barça in the summer of 2010, played 119 times and scored 48 goals and leaves the club after three seasons and eight trophies won. On 15 July, Barcelona announced that midfielder Thiago will be joining German champions Bayern Munich, where he joins his former Barcelona coach Pep Guardiola, for €25 million. The transfer also stipulates that the two clubs will play a friendly sometime within the next four seasons. The 22-year-old leaves after two season with the first team. On 16 July, it was announced that midfielder Sergio Busquets agreed to a contract extension with the club for a further five years until 2018, with an option of an additional year. Busquets' buyout clause remains set at €150 million. On 19 July, Barcelona President Sandro Rosell officially announced the resignation of current manager Tito Vilanova. Vilanova will not be able to perform his managerial duties as he undergoes further treatment for his illness. During the press conference, Rosell announced, "After evaluating the results from the routine check-ups, which Tito Vilanova underwent this week, he was presented with the option to continue treatment to control his illness which will make it impossible to continue his responsibilities as the first team manager of the senior side." As a result, Barça rescheduled their pre-season match against Lechia Gdańsk in Poland to 30 July. On 23 July, former Newell's Old Boys manager Gerardo Martino was officially announced as the new coach of Barcelona and is subsequently signed a two-year contract with the club. The appointment makes Martino, nicknamed "Tata", the fourth Argentine to coach Barça after Helenio Herrera, Roque Olsen and César Luis Menotti.

August
On 1 August, Cristian Tello extended his contract with Barcelona until 30 June 2018, with a set buyout clause of €25 million.
On 18 August, Barcelona won their first match of the La Liga season thrashing Levante 7–0, with goals coming from Alexis Sánchez, Dani Alves and Xavi and braces by Lionel Messi and Pedro. On 25 August, Barça defeated Málaga with a single goal from Adriano before the half-time break. On 28 August, Barça won the 2013 Supercopa de España at the Camp Nou. The 0–0 scoreline at Camp Nou, meant that the 1–1 draw from the first leg at the Vicente Calderón was enough to win the trophy on the away goals rule, with the winning goal coming from Neymar's 66th-minute header.

September
On 1 September, Barcelona made it three wins in a row to ensure top spot on the league table, after a hard-fought victory against Valencia. Messi's first half hat-trick, together with a match saving performance by Víctor Valdés, was enough to see Barça win at the Mestalla for the first time since 2011. On 14 September, Barcelona defeated Sevilla 3–2 at Camp Nou with a 94th-minute winner from Alexis Sánchez. On 18 September, Barcelona defeated Ajax 4–0 at home in their first group match of the 2013–14 UEFA Champions League with a hat-trick from Messi and one goal from Gerard Piqué. With the three goals, Messi took his career tally to 62 goals in the Champions League leaving him nine goals short of former Real Madrid forward and record marksman Raúl. He also became the first player to score four hat-tricks in the Champions League, whilst also netting his 24th such treble for Barça. On 21 September, Barcelona defeated Rayo Vallecano 0–4 at Campo de Vallecas. A hat-trick from Pedro, one from Cesc Fàbregas and another great performance from Valdés, who saved his second penalty in two consecutive matches, gave Barça the three points. This match also marked the first time since 7 May 2008 against Real Madrid where Barcelona did not finish the match with a higher percentage of possession than the opponent. Breaking a streak of 315 matches in a row. On 24 September, Barcelona continued its hot start to the league campaign with a 4–1 victory over Real Sociedad at home. On 28 September, Barcelona defeated newly promoted side Almería on the road with a 0–2 scoreline. With the victory, Barça set a team record with seven wins from the first seven matches in the league. Messi scored his league leading eight goal of the season but was substituted seven minutes later with muscle problems in his right leg. It was confirmed Messi will be out for two to three weeks with a tear to his biceps femoris in his right leg.

October

On 1 October, Barcelona defeated Scottish club Celtic at Celtic Park with a 0–1 scoreline to stay at top of Group H in the Champions League. Fàbregas' goal gave Barça the win, a year after last season's defeat in the same fixture. On 5 October, Barcelona made it eight out of eight in their record breaking start to the league season with a 4–1 win over Real Valladolid at Camp Nou. Goals by Xavi, Neymar and a brace by Sánchez turned the result around after Valladolid's Javi Guerra opener in the tenth minute. On 19 October, Barcelona drop their first points of the season after a goalless draw with Osasuna at El Sadar that draw mean Barça failed to match La Liga's best ever start to a season and put an end to an eight-game winning run. On 22 October, Barcelona failed to clinch a spot in knockout rounds of the Champions League against Milan after a 1–1 draw in Italy. Messi goal equaled the result after Robinho opener in the ninth minute. With the draw, Barça stayed top of Group H with seven points, two more than Milan. On 26 October, the first Clásico of the season was contested at the Camp Nou with Barça securing a 2–1 victory over their great rivals. Strikes from Neymar and a spectacular Sánchez second gave Barça the win that leaves them six points clear of Real Madrid. On 29 October, Barcelona defeated Celta de Vigo 3–0 at Balaídos with goals from Sánchez and Fàbregas to keep Barça undefeated in the league.

November
On 1 November, Barcelona defeated Espanyol 1–0 at Camp Nou and won the first derby of the season the only goal came from Alexis Sánchez. On 6 November, Barcelona defeated Milan 3–1 at Camp Nou and qualified for the Knockout Rounds of the Champions League with two match days left. Messi returned to scoring with a brace after going four games without a goal. Busquets added another to send Barça through to the last 16. On 10 November, Barcelona defeated Real Betis 1–4 at the Benito Villamarín with scores from Neymar, Pedro and two from Fàbregas to put Barça three points ahead of Atlético Madrid in La Liga. Messi picked up an injury and will be sidelined for 6 to 8 weeks with a tear in his left hamstring. On 23 November, Barcelona defeated Granada 4–0 at Camp Nou. Barça overcome their injury woes to beat Granada with two penalty goals from Iniesta, and Fàbregas, while Sánchez and Pedro scored the others. On 26 November, Barcelona suffered their first defeat of the season, a 2–1 loss to Ajax at the Amsterdam Arena. With the loss, Barça fell one victory short of equaling their best start to a season.

December
On 1 December, Barcelona lost to Athletic Bilbao at the San Mamés by a score of 1–0. This was Barcelona's second loss in a week and their first in the league. On 6 December, Barcelona started their Copa del Rey campaign with a victory in Cartagonova with a 1–4 win over Cartagena. Goals from Fàbregas, and Dongou, and a brace by Pedro, gave Barça the first leg victory. On 11 December, Barcelona defeated Celtic 6–1 at Camp Nou and secured the top spot in the group thanks to goals from Piqué, Pedro, Neymar (3) and Tello. On 14 December, Barcelona defeated Villarreal 2–1 at Camp Nou two goals from Neymar gave Barça the victory. On 17 December, Barcelona qualify for the Round of 16 of the Copa del Rey after defeating 3-0 Cartagena at the Camp Nou Pedro, Mariano (o.g.) and Neymar scored for Barça. On 22 December, Barcelona defeated Getafe 2–5 at the Coliseum Alfonso Pérez a hat-trick from Pedro and a brace from Fàbregas gave Barça the victory over Getafe, who led 2–0 after 14 minutes. With the win, Barça stays top of the league into the holiday break and ends 2013, leading La Liga wire-to-wire.

January

On 5 January, Barcelona won their first match of the year against newly promoted side Elche, with a 4–0 score. A hat-trick from Sánchez, including a goal from a free kick, and another from Pedro, gave Barça the win at home.
On 8 January, Barcelona defeated Getafe 4–0 in the first leg of the Round of 16 of the Copa del Rey. Braces from Fàbregas and Messi gave Barça half a ticket to the quarter-finals.
On 11 January, Barcelona were held to a scoreless draw by Atlético Madrid at the Vicente Calderón a gripping game between the two league leaders ended without score.
On 16 January, Barcelona qualify for the Quarter-finals of the Copa del Rey after defeating 2-0 Getafe at the Coliseum Alfonso Pérez a brace from messi gave Barça the win and Xavi features in his 700th match for the team.
On 19 January, Barcelona drew their second league match in a row. A 1–1 draw against Levante at the Ciutat de València saw Gerard Piqué scoring the only goal. On 22 January, Barcelona defeated Levante 4–1 in the first leg of the Quarter-finals of the Copa del Rey three days after the draw in the league an own goal from Juanfran and a hat-trick from Cristian Tello gave Barça the win at the Ciutat de València.
On 26 January, Barcelona defeated Málaga 3–0 at Camp Nou goals from Piqué, Pedro and Sánchez gave Barça the victory.
On 29 January, Barcelona qualified for the Semi-finals of the Copa del Rey after defeating Levante 5–1 at the Camp Nou; Adriano, Puyol, Sánchez (2) and Fàbregas scored for Barça.

February
On 1 February, Barcelona lost their first match at home after being defeated at Camp Nou by Valencia with a scoreline of 2–3, where Sánchez and Messi scored for Barça, while Jordi Alba was sent off with a second yellow. On 5 February, Barcelona defeated Real Sociedad 2–0 at Camp Nou in the first leg of the semi-finals of the Copa del Rey. goals from Busquets and Zubikarai (o.g.) gave Barça half a ticket to the final.
On 9 February, Barcelona defeated Sevilla 4–1 at Ramón Sánchez Pizjuán, goals coming from Sánchez, Fàbregas and a brace by Messi to
give Barça the top spot in the league.
On 12 February, Barcelona reached their 35th Copa del Rey final after a 1–1 draw against Real Sociedad at Anoeta. On 15 February, Barcelona trashed Rayo Vallecano 6–0 at Camp Nou with goals coming from Adriano, Sánchez, Pedro, Neymar and a brace by Lionel Messi. On 18 February, Barcelona defeated Manchester City at the Etihad Stadium with a 0–2 win in their Champions League first leg encounter to move closer to qualifying for the quarter-finals. Messi and Dani Alves scored for Barça.
On 22 February, Barcelona lost to Real Sociedad at the Anoeta by a score of 3–1.

March
On 9 March, Barcelona defeated Almería 4–1 at Camp Nou; goals from Sánchez, Messi, Xavi and Puyol gave Barça the win.
On 8 March, Barcelona lost to Real Valladolid at the José Zorrilla by a score of 1–0. This was Barcelona's second away loss in a row. On 12 March, Barcelona qualified for the quarter-finals of the Champions League after defeating Manchester City 2–1 at Camp Nou. Messi and Dani Alves scored for Barça.
On 16 March, Barcelona trashed Osasuna 7–0 at Camp Nou with goals coming from Sánchez, Iniesta, Tello, Pedro and a hat-trick by Lionel Messi.
On 23 March, the second Clásico of the season was contested at the Santiago Bernabéu with Barça securing a 3–4 victory over their great rivals. A hat-trick from Messi and a lone goal by Iniesta gave Barça the win that leaves them one point off of league leaders Real Madrid.
On 26 March, Barcelona defeated Celta Vigo 3–0 at Camp Nou. A brace from Neymar and a lone goal by Messi gave Barça the win. Valdés picked up an injury and will be sidelined for the rest of the season.
On 29 March, Barcelona defeated Espanyol 0–1 at Cornellà de Llobregat and won the second derby of the season, with the only goal coming from Messi.

April
On 1 April, Barcelona drew in the first leg of the quarter-finals of the Champions League. The match against Atlético Madrid at the Camp Nou ended with a 1–1 draw. Neymar scored the goal for Barcelona.
On 2 April, Barcelona was sanctioned by FIFA for international transfers of minors over various periods between 2009 and 2013. The sanction consisted in a transfer ban at both national and international level for two complete and consecutive transfer periods, together with a fine of CHF 450,000. FIFA's regulations dictate that international transfers regarding minors are only accepted in three scenarios—the player's parents have moved to another country for non-related reasons; the move takes place within the European Union if the player is aged between 16 and 18, or the player's home is less than 50 kilometres from the national border being crossed. However, it was temporarily lifted until the appeal process, giving the club the chance to purchase players in the summer transfer window of 2014,

May
On 17 May, in a game where they needed to defeat Atlético Madrid (who eliminated them from the UEFA Champions League in the quarterfinals earlier in the year) to be crowned champions of La Liga for the 23rd time, they drew after Atlético defender Diego Godín headed in the equalizer in the 49th minute, giving Atlético the championship.

Players

Squad information

From the youth system

Transfers in

Total spending:  €70.1 Million

Transfers out

Total income:  €31 million

Expenditure:   €39.1 million

Technical staff

Statistics

Squad, appearances and goals

Goal scorers

Last updated: 17 May 2014

Disciplinary record
Includes all competitive matches. Players listed below made at least one appearance for Barcelona first squad during the season.

Pre-season and friendlies

Competitions

Supercopa de España

La Liga

League table

Results by round

Matches

Copa del Rey

Round of 32

Round of 16

Quarter-finals

Semi-finals

Final

UEFA Champions League

Group stage

Knockout phase

Round of 16

Quarter-finals

Copa Catalunya

References

Spanish football clubs 2013–14 season
2013–14 UEFA Champions League participants seasons
2013-14
2013–14 in Catalan football